Carl Valeri (born 14 August 1984) is a retired Australian professional footballer.

Valeri was born in Canberra and played youth football for Tuggeranong United and at the Australian Institute of Sport before moving to Italy to sign with Inter Milan in 2002. Valeri spent over ten years in Italy, most notably at Sassuolo and Grosseto.

Valeri made over 50 appearances for the Australian national team from 2007 to 2014, including at the 2010 FIFA World Cup. He also represented Australia's under-23 side at the 2004 Summer Olympics.

Early life
Valeri was born and raised in Canberra, the son of a former National Soccer League midfielder, Walter Valeri. Carl attended Mary MacKillop College and later Lake Ginninderra College.

Club career

Valeri was signed as a teenager by Italian giants Inter Milan. He was loaned out to various clubs in Italy to gain further experience, including Grosseto. He joined Grosseto permanently in June 2007.

In January 2010 Valeri joined Sassuolo. Representing Australia in the starting 11 for the 2010 World Cup is his greatest achievement to date.

In May 2013, Valeri and his club Sassuolo finished as Serie B champions, thus securing automatic promotion to Serie A for the first time in their history.

In January 2014, he returned to Serie B with relegation battling Ternana until 30 June in hopes of securing a World Cup place with the Socceroos

In June 2014, Carl Valeri returned to his home country signing a 3-year deal with Melbourne Victory. Valeri was an integral part of Victory's 2015 Championship team, starting all 29 games that season.

In September 2015 he was appointed captain of the team. Following an interrupted 2015/16 season, Valeri bounced back and became a regular starter for Victory in both the 2016/17 and 2017/18 seasons.

In April 2019, Valeri announced that he would retire at the conclusion of the 2018–19 A-League season.

In May 2019, it was announced that Valeri had signed on for National Premier Leagues Victoria side Dandenong City, along with former A-League players Adrian Leijer and Brendon Santalab.

International career

Valeri has played for Australia at all international youth levels; Under-17, Under-20 and Under-23.

He captained the Australian Under-17 team, the 'Joeys', at the 2001 FIFA World Youth Championship and competed with the Under-23 squad, the 'Olyroos', at the 2004 Athens Olympics.

After being an unused substitute in an 2007 Asian Cup qualifier against Bahrain in 2006, the 22-year-old received his second call up to the senior Australian national team in March 2007, as a replacement for the injured defensive midfielder Vince Grella.

He made his international debut on 24 March 2007 in a friendly game against China, which Australia won 2–0. This made him the 501st player to be capped for Australia. He made his home debut in a friendly against Uruguay.

Former Socceroos coach Graham Arnold has described Valeri as a key player of the future, and possible successor to Grella. This led to certain sections of the Australian media dubbing him "Mini Vinnie."

Honours
With Melbourne Victory:
 A-League Championship: 2014–2015, 2017–18
 A-League Premiership: 2014–2015
 FFA Cup: 2015

With Grosseto:
Serie C1: 2006–07
Supercoppa di Lega di Prima Divisione: 2007

With Sassuolo:
Serie B: 2012–13

Individual
 Melbourne Victory Goal of the Season: 2014–15
 Melbourne Victory Players' Player of the Season: 2014–15
 Victory Medal: 2016–17

Career statistics

Club

International caps

References

External links

US Grosseto profile
FFA – Socceroo profile
OzFootball profile
"Player of the Future" article in The Age

1984 births
Living people
Sportspeople from Canberra
Soccer players from the Australian Capital Territory
Australian soccer players
Australia youth international soccer players
Australia under-20 international soccer players
Australia international soccer players
Australian expatriate soccer players
Footballers at the 2004 Summer Olympics
Olympic soccer players of Australia
S.P.A.L. players
F.C. Grosseto S.S.D. players
Inter Milan players
U.S. Sassuolo Calcio players
Ternana Calcio players
Melbourne Victory FC players
A-League Men players
Serie B players
2007 AFC Asian Cup players
2010 FIFA World Cup players
2011 AFC Asian Cup players
Australian Institute of Sport soccer players
Australian people of Italian descent
Association football midfielders
Australian expatriate sportspeople in Italy
Expatriate footballers in Italy